Qaderabad (also Romanized as Qāderābād; also known as Qādīrābād) is a village in Chaharduli Rural District, in the Central District of Asadabad County, Hamadan Province, Iran. At the 2006 census, its population was 382, in 93 families.

References 

Populated places in Asadabad County